The Jankó keyboard is a musical keyboard layout for a piano designed by Paul von Jankó, a Hungarian pianist and engineer, in 1882. It was designed to overcome two limitations on the traditional piano keyboard: the large-scale geometry of the keys (stretching beyond a ninth, or even an octave, can be difficult or impossible for pianists with small hands), and the fact that each scale has to be fingered differently. Instead of a single row, the Jankó keyboard has an array of keys consisting of two interleaved manuals with three touch-points for every key lever, making six rows of keys. Each vertical column of three keys is a semitone away from the neighboring ones, which are in the alternate rows. Thus within each row the interval from one note to the next is a whole step.

This key layout results in each chord and scale having the same shape on the keyboard with the same fingerings regardless of key, so there is no change in geometry when transposing music. Furthermore, the use of multiple rows allows the pianist to more naturally follow the contour of their hand and accounts for the different lengths of the fingers. The configuration retains the colouring of traditional keyboards (white naturals, black sharps and flats) for pedagogical purposes.

For an 88-note (full size) keyboard, there would be 264 keys in total, with each note playable by three keys in vertical alignment. In the picture above, the white keys have been coloured to show how the keys are interconnected.

The Jankó Keyboard caused a stir at the time of its invention, in large part due to its unique look and the intelligent design behind the keyboard. American piano manufacturer Decker Brothers put the keyboard into production around 1891, and the Paul de Janko Conservatory of Music was established in New York around the same time. There was even a manual written by W. Bradley Keeler called How to Play the New Keyboard.

Despite all this, the Jankó keyboard never achieved wide popularity.  Music educators were not convinced that the benefits of the new keyboard were enough to challenge the traditional keyboard.  Few performers were prepared to relearn their repertoire on a new keyboard with entirely different fingering.  Both reasons left keyboard instrument manufacturers afraid to invest in a redesigned keyboard which promised to have only marginal commercial success.

Many embodiments of this keyboard have appeared since its conception.  Jankó himself (in German patent 25852, dated 14 January 1884) originally chose a key shape which resembled the slim, black keys on the familiar piano keyboard.  A year later (in German patent 32138, dated 1 July 1885) the keys became wider and shorter. Other inventors have filed patents for keyboards which are substantially similar to his design, differing most often in key shape or instrument to which those keyboards are affixed, including:
 John Trotter, English Patent 3404, 4 March 1811
 William A. B. Lunn devised in 1843 under the name of Arthur Wallbridge a sequential keyboard with two parallel rows of keys, each in whole tones
 Miguel Theodore de Folly, Useful Registered Design Number 448 for a geometrical keyboard for the pianoforte, 1845
 Gould and Marsh, 1859
 Edgar, 1871
 Cramer, 1874
 McChesney, 1875
 Stewart, 1886
 Adams, 1901
 Nordbö, 1916
 Barnett, 1934
 Reuther, 1940
 Firestone, 1945

See also

 Isomorphic keyboard
 Generalized keyboard

References

External links 

 Pianoworld article
 The Cipher for Whole Tone or Janko Chromatic Keyboard
 Intuitive instruments for improvisers Jankó keyboard
 The Uniform Keyboard (contains many pictures of instruments with Jankó keyboards)
 The Chromatone 312 (MIDI keyboard and synthesizer with Janko layout)
 Mouse and PC Keyboard Music (Windows  program) - try out Janko layouts with PC keyboard (similar layout of keys) - any tuning for the keys.
 Piano vs. Accordions including 6+6(Janko) (Java Apps on Windows and Mac) - Try and compare many musical key layouts with vertically held keyboard.
 Daskin Manufacturing (MIDI controller keyboards with Janko layout)
 Wicki.org.uk, free UK site containing  Java, Flash, and PC applications to enable users to play their alpha-numeric keyboard to sound 12 equal tempered pitches using Wicki/Hayden or Janko layout.
 IsoKeys is a free application that provides a Jankó keyboard on touch-screen Android devices.
 Hexiano is a free and open-source application that provides a Jankó keyboard on touch-screen Android devices.
 Demo, Demonstration of the advantages of the Jankó Keyboard by Paul Vandervoort, considered to be the world's foremost player of the device.  Program: "Kitten on the Keys" by Zez Confrey; explanation of the Janko note arrangement and advantages over a standard keyboard; demonstration of musical passages which are difficult or impossible to play on a standard keyboard; "C#-Major Prelude" from the Well-Tempered Clavier by J.S. Bach; Boogie-woogie rendition of "Bye Bye Blackbird".
  (A report on the Jankó keyboard shown at the 1893 Chicago Exposition)

Hungarian inventions
Musical keyboard layouts